Tom Walker is an Australian comedian, performer, podcaster and Twitch streamer.

Career 

Walker trained in clowning at the École Philippe Gaulier. His improv awards include the 2007 Sydney School Theatresports Cup (Senior Division) and 2011 National Theatresports Championship.

He won the Melbourne International Comedy Festival's Best Newcomer and Director's Choice awards in 2016 for his show Beep Boop and appeared in Whose Line Is It Anyway? Australia. His show Bee Boo was nominated in the category of Best Show for the 2017 Melbourne International Comedy Festival Award. Walker was long-listed for the 2021 AACTA Awards.

His 2019 show Very Very, directed by Zoë Coombs Marr, was picked up as an Amazon Prime special and released in May 2020.

Walker and his partner Demi Lardner's 2019 show We Mustn't won the Sydney Comedy Festival's Directors Choice award in 2019. They also co-host the podcast bigsofttitty.png.

References

External links 

Living people
Australian stand-up comedians
Australian male comedians
Australian podcasters
Year of birth missing (living people)